= Ammonium calcium phosphate =

Names
- IUPAC name azanium;calcium;phosphate
- Other names Ammonium calcium phosphate

Identifiers
CAS Number	51686-31-8
3D model (JSmol)	Interactive image; heptahydrate: Interactive image
ChemSpider	7969630
PubChem CID	9793863; heptahydrate: 161116927
- InChI: InChI=1S/Ca.H3N.H3O4P/c;;1-5(2,3)4/h;1H3;(H3,1,2,3,4)/q+2;;/p-2 Key: YNGQHHUHCOYPKT-UHFFFAOYSA-L; heptahydrate: InChI=1S/Ca.H3N.H3O4P.7H2O/c;;1-5(2,3)4;;;;;;;/h;1H3;(H3,1,2,3,4);7*1H2/q+2;;;;;;;;;/p-2 Key: UKLAVEVJLCVRMM-UHFFFAOYSA-L
- SMILES: [NH4+].[O-]P(=O)([O-])[O-].[Ca+2]; heptahydrate: [NH4+].O.O.O.O.O.O.O.[O-]P(=O)([O-])[O-].[Ca+2]

Properties
Chemical formula	CaH_{4}NO_{4}P
Molar mass	153.087 g·mol^{−1}
Appearance	colorless crystals
Density	1.561 g/cm^{3} (hydrate)
Solubility in water	insoluble
- Except where otherwise noted, data are given for materials in their standard state (at 25 °C [77 °F], 100 kPa). Infobox references

Ammonium calcium phosphate is a chemical compound with the chemical formula CaNH_{4}PO_{4}.

== Physical properties ==
The compound forms colorless crystals, insoluble in water.

It also forms heptahydrates CaNH_{4}PO_{4} • 7H_{2}O.
